Kitchen is a 1997 Hong Kong drama film directed by Yim Ho. It was entered into the 47th Berlin International Film Festival.

Cast
 Jordan Chan as Louie
 Yasuko Tomita as Aggie
 Kar-Ying Law as Emma
 Karen Mok as Jenny
 Siu-Ming Lau as Mr. Chiu
 Koon-Lan Law as Chika

References

External links

1997 films
1997 drama films
1990s Cantonese-language films
Films directed by Yim Ho
Hong Kong drama films
1990s Hong Kong films